Essence-Function (體用, Chinese pinyin: tǐ yòng, Korean: che-yong), also called Substance and Function, is a key concept in Chinese philosophy and other Far-Eastern philosophies. Essence is Absolute Reality, the fundamental "cause" or origin, while Function is relative or concrete reality, the concrete manifestation of Essence. Ti and yong do not represent two separate things, such as Absolute Reality and Concrete Reality. They are always two, flexibly-viewed aspects of a single thing.

Etymology
 Essence, 體 (ti), Korean pronunciation 체, or CHE: body; shape, form; entity, unit; style, fashion, system; substance, essence; theory (as opposed to practice). 
 Function, or Application 用 (yong), Korean pronunciation 용, or YONG: use, employ, apply, operate; exert; effect; finance; need; eat, drink.

Together they form the phrase 體用 ti-yong, 체용 che-yong, Essence-Function.

Meaning

Essence is Absolute Reality, the fundamental "cause" or origin, while Function is manifest or relative reality, the discernible effects or manifestations of Essence. Essence-Function describes the interplay between the two: although Absolute Reality is the ultimate reality, the relative reality nevertheless also exists, as is evident from concrete reality. The relationship between these two realms is expressed in such schemata as the Five Ranks and the Oxherding Pictures. Various terms are used for "absolute" and "relative".

The tree forms a metaphor for Essence-Function, with the roots being Essence and the branches being Function. According to Muller "the most important application of t'i-yung thought [...] is to the human being, where the human mind is seen as "essence," and one's words, thoughts and actions are seen as "function."

According to Sung-bae Park the concept of essence-function is used by East Asian Buddhists "to show a non-dualistic and non-discriminate nature in their enlightenment experience," but does not exclude notions of subjectivity and objectivity. According to Sung-bae Park, the terms "essence" and "function" can also be rendered as "body" and "the body's functions," which is a more personal and less abstract expression of nonduality.

Origins and application of the concept

China
The t'i-yung developed in the Wei (220–265) – Jin (266–420) period of Chinese history, when "Unification of the Three Teachings" ideology was domimant, striving for a theoretical reconciliation of Confucianism, Daoism, and Buddhism. The t'i-yung concept was first known as pen-mo ("primary-last" or "primary-subordinate"), and developed into t'i-yung. In the initial development of the theory, "thinkers considered one of the three philosophies as 'the primary' or 't'i' and the others as 'the last' or 'yung,' insisting that their own philosophy was superior to the others." However, although the theory was used to arrange the three teachings hierarchically, it also confirmed their inner unity.

The concept developed with the introduction of Buddhism in China, adapting Buddhist philosophy to a Chinese frame of reference. One of the core Madhyamaka Buddhist doctrines is the Two Truths Doctrine, which says that there is a relative truth and an ultimate truth. In Madhyamaka the two truths are two epistemological truths: two different ways to look at reality. Phenomenal reality is relative real or true: one can make factual statements about concrete or manifest reality, but those statements have a relative trueness, since everything that exists changes, and is bound to dissolve again. Ultimately everything is empty, sunyata, of an underlying unchanging essence. Sunyata itself is also "empty," 'the emptiness of emptiness', which means that sunyata itself does not constitute a higher or ultimate "essence" or "reality. The Prajnaparamita-sutras and Madhyamaka emphasized the non-duality of form and emptiness: form is emptiness, emptiness is form, as the heart sutra says.

When Buddhism was introduced to China, the two truths doctrine was a point of confusion. Chinese thinking took this to refer to two ontological truths: reality exists of two levels, a relative level and an absolute level. The doctrines of Buddha-nature and Sunyata were understood as akin to Dao and the Taoist non-being. It took the Chinese world several centuries to realize that sunyata has another meaning.

Based on their understanding of the Mahayana Mahaparinirvana Sutra the Chinese supposed that the teaching of the Buddha-nature was, as stated by that sutra, the final Buddhist teaching, and that there is an essential truth above sunyata and the two truths. The idea that ultimate reality is present within the daily world of relative reality melded well with Chinese culture, which emphasized the mundane world and society. But this does not tell how the absolute is present in the relative world:

The notions appear already in the Zhongyong (Doctrine of the Mean) attributed to Zi Si (481–402 BCE), the grandson of Confucius. The first philosopher to systematically use the ti-yong schema was Wang Bi (226–249) in his commentary to Daodejing, chapter 22, when he discussed the metaphysical relation between non-being (wu) and being (you). Subsequently, the notion has been borrowed from the Neo-Daoist philosophy to other schools of Chinese philosophy, including Hua-yen and other schools of Buddhism, and Neo-Confucianism of Cheng Yi and Zhu Xi, and served as a basic tool of interpretation. With these schools it has travelled to Korea, Japan and Vietnam, and has been developed there.

The Awakening of Mahayana Faith, a key text in Chinese Buddhism, also employs Essence-Function. Although attributed to Aśvaghoṣa (?80-?150 CE), and traditionally thought to have been translated Paramartha (499–569), in 553, many modern scholars now opine that it was actually composed by Paramartha or one of his students.

The concept was employed by Confucian reformers of the Self-Strengthening Movement at the end of the Qing dynasty's (1644 to 1912) rule in China, in the phrase "Chinese learning for essence, Western learning for application". The belief was that China should maintain its own Confucian style of learning to keep the "essence" of society, while at the same time using Western learning for "practical application" in developing its infrastructure and economy.

Korean Buddhism
Essence-Function is an essential element in the philosophy of Wonhyo (617–686 CE). Wonhyo developed t'i-yung theory into its most influential form in his commentary on the Ta ch'eng ch'i hsin lun (Treatise on the Awakening of Mahayana Faith). This scripture proclaims the non-duality of the phenomenal or mundane world and the tathagata-garbha. Wonhyo saw the Treatise'''s treatment of t'i-yung as a way of harmonizing the thought of Madhyamika and Yogacara. For Wonhyo, t'i corresponds to Madhyamika's ultimate truth and yung'' to its conventional truth, and these, in turn, are the two gates of Yogacara's one-mind.

Chinul (1158–1210) and Kihwa (1376–1433) also employ and develop this idea of Essence-Function in their writings in particular ways. Wonch'uk (613–696) employed the conceptual and analytical tool, Essence-Function, as an exegetical, hermeneutical and syncretic device.

Linguistics

The concept is also employed in Korean and Japanese linguistics. Words that do not change their form, mostly nouns, which are not inflected in Korean and Japanese, are referred to as 'essence' words (體言), while verbs and most adjectives, which are highly inflected in those languages, are referred to as 'function' words (用言).

See also
Buddhism
 Gankyil
 Korean Buddhism
 Korean philosophy
 Sentient beings (Buddhism)
 Store consciousness
 Five Ranks
Christianity
 Essence–energies distinction

Notes

References

Sources

Printed sources

Web-sources

Religion articles needing expert attention
Chinese words and phrases
Chinese philosophy
Confucianism
Buddhist philosophical concepts
Buddhism in Korea
Nondualism